The Piscataqua River (Abenaki: Pskehtekwis) is a  tidal river forming the boundary of the U.S. states of New Hampshire and Maine from its origin at the confluence of the Salmon Falls River and Cochecho River.

The river runs southeastward, with New Hampshire to the south and west and Maine to the north and east, and empties into the Gulf of Maine east of Portsmouth, New Hampshire. The cities/towns of Portsmouth, New Castle, Newington, Kittery and Eliot have developed around the harbor.

History 

Named by the area's original Abenaki inhabitants, the word Piscataqua is believed to be a combination of peske (branch) with tegwe (a river with a strong current, possibly tidal). The first known European to explore the river was Martin Pring in 1603. Captain John Smith placed a spelling similar to "Piscataqua" for the region on his map of 1614. The river was the site of the first sawmill in the colonies in 1623, the same year the contemporary spelling "Piscataqua" was first recorded.

Once salmon, sturgeon, oysters, clams, scallops, lobsters, mussels, eels, seals, and many others species of marine life were common in the river, evidenced by such tributaries as the Salmon Falls River, Sturgeon Creek and Seal Rock in Eliot, Maine, the Oyster River in Durham, New Hampshire, and the Lamprey River in Newmarket, New Hampshire.  All but the salmon and sturgeon remain, with fishing for striped bass and bluefish common recreational sports.

In the mid 1630s some of the region's earliest European settlers built a sawmill in what is today's Berwick, Maine, on a tributary above the head of tide of the Piscataqua. Thought to be the first over-shot water-powered site in America, it became known as the "Great Works", giving name to today's Great Works River.

After the Allies' European victory in the Second World War, four surrendered German U-boats traveled upriver to the Portsmouth Naval Shipyard, with their captains and crews interned as POWs at Portsmouth Naval Prison. U-805 was the first to arrive, towed up the river to a rendezvous with U.S. officials on a tugboat off the Navy Yard on May 15, 1945. U-873 and U-1228 arrived the next day.

U-234, by far the greatest prize, arrived on May 19, seized off Nova Scotia by the U.S. destroyer escort . It had left Germany with a cargo bound for Japan of a disassembled Messerschmitt Me 262 jet plane, the most sophisticated fighter of World War II; two top Japanese scientists; and two high-ranking Nazi officers. While this was enough to create a media sensation, it was decades later before the U.S. government revealed that the sub also carried a top secret load of uranium oxide produced by the German atomic weapons program bound for a last-ditch Japanese effort. Instead, the extremely valuable nuclear material was diverted to the U.S.' top secret Manhattan Project, and ended up part of the bomb the U.S. Army Air Corps dropped over Hiroshima to hasten the end of the Pacific war.

The shipyard is located on Seavey's Island in Kittery, Maine near the Piscataqua's mouth. Long regarded by some as being in New Hampshire, the yard was claimed by that state into the 2000s. However, the Piscataqua River border dispute over Seavey's Island was settled by a 2001 U.S. Supreme Court decision which cited a 1977 decision affirming New Hampshire's claim that the state borders met at the center of the river's navigable channel as described in a 1740 decree, thus placing the island in Maine.

Estuary
The Piscataqua River and its tributaries, including Great Bay, form a substantial estuarine environment. Two rivers, the Salmon Falls and Cochecho, join to form the Piscataqua on the eastern edge of Dover, New Hampshire, at the northwest corner of Eliot, Maine. Five rivers with tidal stretches flow into Great Bay: the Bellamy, Oyster, Lamprey, Squamscott, and Winnicut, and the Great Works River drains into the tidal portion of the Salmon Falls.

See also 

 Badger's Island
 Great Bay (New Hampshire)
 Little Bay Bridge
 List of rivers of Maine
 List of rivers of New Hampshire
 Memorial Bridge (Portsmouth, New Hampshire)
 Piscataqua River Bridge
 Point of Graves Burial Ground
 Prescott Park (New Hampshire)
 Sarah Mildred Long Bridge

External links 
 MaineRivers.org Piscataqua River
 History as Border of New Hampshire
 Seacoast Forts of Portsmouth Harbor from American Forts Network
 Port of New Hampshire

References 

 Ralph May, Piscataqua, The Correctness of Use and the Meaning of the Word (1966), Randall Press, Portsmouth, New Hampshire
New Hampshire v. Maine (2001) U.S. Supreme Court Case regarding border dispute

 Ports of Piscataqua, William Gurdon Saltonstall, Harvard University Press, Cambridge, Massachusetts, 1941

Rivers of Maine
Rivers of New Hampshire
Borders of New Hampshire
Borders of Maine
Estuaries of New Hampshire
Estuaries of Maine
Rivers of Rockingham County, New Hampshire
Bodies of water of York County, Maine
Bodies of water of Rockingham County, New Hampshire
Rivers of York County, Maine
Maine placenames of Native American origin
New Hampshire placenames of Native American origin